The German Flood Service Medal 2013 is a military and civil award of Germany. Established 2 July 2013 by joint decree of the Federal Minister of the Interior Hans-Peter Friedrich and Federal Minister of Defence Thomas de Maizière, the medal is awarded for approved service during the 2013 European floods. It was approved by the President of Germany on 23 October 2013.

Criteria
The medal may be awarded to the members of the Bundeswehr, Bundespolizei, Technisches Hilfswerk, foreign armed forces, as well as civilians who provided assistance to the relief efforts of the federal agencies. To be eligible persons must have served at least one day after 30 May 2013, in the flood affected areas of the Danube and Elbe basins during the 2013 European floods.

The medal is awarded by the Federal Ministry of Defence to members of the Bundeswehr, foreign military personnel, and other individuals who provided assistance to the ministry during relief efforts. The Federal Ministry of the Interior awards the medal to members of the Bundespolizei, Technisches Hilfswerk, and others who provided assistance to the ministry during relief efforts.

Appearance
The obverse of the medal depicts stylized flood waters passing before partially submerged buildings. Below the scene, in relief, is Fluthilfe 2013 (Flood relief 2013). The reverse bears the Bundesadler with the words Dank und Anerkennung (Gratitude and Appreciation) below.

The service ribbon of the medal is in the same colors as the suspension ribbon.

See also
Awards and decorations of the German Armed Forces
German Flood Service Medal (2002)

References

Civil awards and decorations of Germany
Military awards and decorations of Germany (Bundeswehr)
German campaign medals
Floods in Germany
Awards established in 2013
2013 establishments in Germany